Peter Allan (6 September 1799 – 31 August 1849) was an English recluse and eccentric who carved rocks in the Marsden Bay at Marsden, South Shields into a house.

Early life 
Born to Peter Allan, a shoemaker in Gladsmuir and Jane Renny, who was the daughter of Archibald Kenley of Tranent, Allan was initially a valet to Williams Williamson and a gamekeeper for the Marquess of Londonderry.  He later ran a tavern in the village Whitburn on the Durham coast.

Marsden 
After becoming infatuated with and working at the quarries near his property, he decided to turn a limestone cliff in the Marsden Grotto in the Marsden Bay into an actual house. He carved out fifteen rooms which connected to a farmhouse and tavern (The Grotto) on the cliff above.

He mostly remained with his wife and children in the rock and did not often visit the surrounding towns. He also saved a number of boats offshore and a group of children from drowning. In 1848 the lord of the manor attempted to eject him based on his ownership of the above land. Allan successfully defended his right to live at the spot in a lawsuit, but died on 31 August 1849, perhaps affected by the stress. The structure, which became a sort of public attraction, was obliterated by a collapse of the cliff in February 1865. The Grotto remains, connected to a hotel.

Controversy 
Although the history has some documentary backing, some insist that the story is exaggerated. Alan Robinson wrote a book in the 1970s denying the notion that Allan was a hermit.

External links
https://web.archive.org/web/20020107055544/http://website.lineone.net/~d.ord/Grotto.htm - pictures and history of the Allan, the pub, and the area
https://web.archive.org/web/20051109122833/http://www.wearsideonline.com/mysteries01.html - Mysteries of the Grotto

References 

 Sidney Lee, ‘Allan, Peter (1799-1849)’, rev. H. C. G. Matthew, Oxford Dictionary of National Biography, Oxford University Press, 2004. 

1799 births
1849 deaths
People from South Shields
People from East Lothian